The Skat (also transliterated Skǎt or Skut) is a river in the western Danubian Plain of northern Bulgaria and a right tributary of the Ogosta.

The Skat takes its source from the Rechka area near the Veslets mountain in Vratsa Province, part of the western Fore-Balkan Mountains, north of the Manyashki Vrah peak. It goes round the Borovan hill from the west and runs through a shallow gorge near Ohoden. From that point on, it has low banks and mostly flows through plain terrain with a number of meanders. The Skat is 510 metres wide, with a sand-covered bed. Its valley is asymmetrical, as the right bank is normally steeper than the left one. Before the construction of the atomic power station in Kozlodui the Skat flew into Danube directly. Then the Ogosta's course has been altered to free space for the atomic station separate canals and now the smaller Skat flows into the Ogosta at Saraevo, west of Oryahovo.

The Skat is 140 kilometres long and has a drainage basin of 1,070 square kilometres. Its main tributaries are the Barzina and the Greznitsa. The river is used for irrigation and one reservoir has been built along it, the Ohoden Reservoir.

References

 

Rivers of Bulgaria
Landforms of Vratsa Province